The 1995 World Short Track Speed Skating Team Championships was the 5th edition of the World Short Track Speed Skating Team Championships which took place on 24–26 March 1995 in Zoetermeer, Netherlands.

Medal winners

References

External links
Results
 Results in ISU's database

World Short Track Speed Skating Team Championships
1995 World Short Track Speed Skating Team Championships